The Phoinix: Age of Demigods, often shortened to The Phoinix, is a young adult epic-fantasy novel created by S. L. Mancuso. This is her debut novel and book one in a series of four novels published in July 2015. The second book in The Phoinix series in entitled The Phoinix: The Light of Albion. It converges six different polytheistic religions into one epic story by exploring the mysticism and powers of the gods shown in Greek, Norse, Roman, Egyptian, Phoenician, and Celtic mythologies. It contains beloved familiar stories while revealing new exciting tales that often go untold.

Influences 

S. L. Mancuso has stated that she pulls inspiration from her friends, family, and favorite T.V. shows/movies/books. Influential media includes Supernatural, The Highlander franchise, and Lord of the Rings.

Books

Age of Demigods 
First novel in the four-part series is set in the ancient civilizations of Ancient Greece and Ancient Cymru. The story follows a young Etruscan princess that has been plagued by nightmares every year on the night of her birthday when a full Blood-Moon rises. She is then swept away from her palace and the protection of her parents by her long time friend, Eoghan MacBeatha, a Druid apprentice. Eoghan steals the princess away from her homeland after a threat has stormed the palace, promising to kill her parents, Remus and Alina. Three allies, Lysandros, Brian, and Cailean, step in to save Remus and Alina from the attack, but end up having to say goodbye to a dear friend before setting off on a quest to find Breanna and Eoghan.

The book continues on a three quest adventure until the quests converge into an epic battle for survival among demigods, gods, and an old, resurrected threat the gods created to end war, Elpis, The Queen. Elpis has long been dead, destroyed by her husband, Eversor, under a spell from the gods. Upon her death The Power that lived in her blood escaped destruction and sought refuge in Etruria and Cymru until it could find its true vessel, Breanna, was ready to accept it. Eversor hunts Bre and her family in order to steal The Power and resurrect Elpis from the dead.

Through bloody carnage, Eversor manages to restore Elpis and half her powers. It is then the gods beg for Breanna's and her followers' protection. After realizing that the horrifying Blood-Moon nightmares were actually Elpis' memories reaching out to her, Bre doubts the intentions of the gods and wonders if they will try to destroy her like they did Elpis.

Breanna is a young girl with an old destiny that is torn between power and survival.

Characters 
 Breanna
 Eoghan
 Cole
 Nikolaos 
 Leo
 Remus and Romulus
 Alina
 Brian
 Cailean
 Lysandros
 Elpis
 Eversor
 Clover
 Leora
 Aurora
 Whisper

References 

2015 American novels
American young adult novels
Greek and Roman deities in fiction
2015 debut novels